"Too Beautiful to Last" is a song recorded by Engelbert Humperdinck, which was the theme from the 1971 historical biopic Nicholas and Alexandra.

In 1972, the song was released on the album In Time and as a single. The song spent 10 weeks on the UK Singles Chart, peaking at No. 14, while reaching No. 1 in Hong Kong, No. 9 in South Africa, No. 17 on the Irish Singles Chart, and No. 66 on Canada's "RPM 100". In the United States, the song spent 3 weeks on the Billboard Hot 100 chart, peaking at No. 86, while reaching No. 16 on Billboards Easy Listening chart.

Chart performance

References

1971 songs
1972 singles
Decca Records singles
Engelbert Humperdinck songs
Songs with lyrics by Paul Francis Webster
Songs written for films